The 1983 Australian Touring Car Championship was a CAMS sanctioned motor racing title for drivers of Group C Touring Cars. The title, which was the 24th Australian Touring Car Championship, was contested over a series which began on 6 February 1983 at Calder Park Raceway and ended on 19 June at Lakeside International Raceway after eight rounds.

The championship was won by Allan Moffat driving a Mazda RX-7.

Season Summary
The championship was won by Allan Moffat, his fourth and final Australian Touring Car Championship and a first for Mazda, who were helping to fund Moffat's team and it was also the first ATCC win for a Japanese manufacturer. Moffat himself dominated the racing, taking four out of the eight race wins, but a beneficial points structure for smaller capacity cars allowed George Fury (driving a turbocharged version of the Nissan Bluebird) to push Moffat all the way to the title, despite not actually winning a race. The folly in the point system was exposed at the first round at Calder when Moffat won the race from Fury, but Fury actually led the championship by finishing second outright in a smaller capacity car (Moffat scored 25 for winning while Fury scored 27 for finishing second). When Fury took the lead for a brief time at Calder, it was the first time that a turbo powered car had led an ATCC race.

Peter Brock in his Marlboro Holden Dealer Team VH Commodore SS finished third in the championship. Brock's early season form and some uncharacteristic reliability problems saw him lagging in ninth place at the midway point in the championship after failing to finish at Calder and Symmons Plains thanks to gearbox failure both times, while finishing third at Sandown and ninth at Wanneroo after spinning out of the lead in a dice with Moffat and Fury (Moffat's win at Wanneroo caused a sensation due to his Formula One style mid-race pit stop for fuel). Brock's championship got back on track with an all-the-way win in Adelaide where he won by the length of the Commodore's bumper bar from Moffat who actually got his Mazda in front 50 metres from the flag but lost out to the power of the V8 Commodore. From there he finished with two seconds and a win to round out the series.

Brock's win in the final round at Lakeside was easily one of the drives of the series. In difficult, wet conditions that actually suited the smaller RX-7's rather than the heavier Commodores and Falcons, he lapped the entire field in the 35 laps after taking the lead on lap 2. His race almost ended coming out of the Karrasell on the first lap when the left rear tyre of his Commodore got out into the mud and pitched the car sideways, almost into the path of Gregg Hansford in the second Allan Moffat Racing Mazda RX-7. Brock recovered still in 3rd place and soon past an ailing Dick Johnson whose Falcon had suffered a power steering pump failure on the grid which would cause his early retirement as he could not steer the car properly. Brock then passed early leader Moffat on lap 2 and proceeded to run away from the field. Hansford also overtook Moffat who was wisely driving with an eye on the title, but Brock lapped the #31 Mazda through the back section of the circuit on the last lap.

Moffat, Brock and Allan Grice (who won rounds 2 and 3 at Sandown and Symmons Plains in his new Roadways Racing Commodore before fading later in the series) were the only race winners in the 1983 ATCC. Defending champion Dick Johnson battled season long with an ill-handling Ford XE Falcon and could only manage two distant 3rd placings at both Sandown and Wanneroo (where he led for the only time in the series) to finish a disappointing 6th in the championship, 94 points behind Moffat. Johnson's 351cui, 5.8L V8 Falcon had the power, but not the handling to be a serious contender for the crown. It was only discovered before the final round at Lakeside that the problem with the Falcon's handling had been both a lack of rear tyres as well as the front suspension of the car.

Whilst Nissan driver George Fury, helped by consistent performances, led the series (uncorrected points) going into the final round at Lakeside, Fury was essentially 5 points behind Moffat in the points system corrected for the top 7 races, therefore Fury needed to finish ahead of Moffat or Moffat finish in 6th place or worse to claim the title. As Moffat had finished well ahead of Fury in all but the one race were the Mazda broke its axle, team manager Howard Marsden decided the team would skip the round as they were not in major contention to win the title (officially to further develop the car before Bathurst). Moffat finished the final race in 3rd position, behind Brock and teammate Gregg Hansford, claiming the 1983 ATCC 6 points ahead of Fury in second place.

Controversy also reigned throughout the series with some teams such as the MHDT (Brock) and STP Roadways (Grice) claiming that Moffat was foxing during the championship and not racing as fast as he could in an effort to 'hoodwink' CAMS into believing the RX-7's, which ran the 1.2 Litre 12A rotary engine in the championship, needed the larger and more powerful (by some ) 1.3 Litre 13B engine to be competitive against the V8's at Bathurst. Ultimately CAMS approved the larger 13B engine for the RX-7's (as well as a late approval for fuel injection), but also granted concessions to the Commodores and Falcons which ended up giving the bigger cars a speed advantage on the Mountain.

Controversially CAMS announced the concessions for the post-ATCC 1 August homologation during the race of Round 7 at Oran Park via the ABC's telecast of the race, with ABC commentators Will Hagon and John Smailes making the announcement mid-race. In a TV interview with Smailes immediately following his 2nd placing to Moffat, Peter Brock was informed of the new homologations and expressed his displeasure with CAMS for announcing it on television during the race and not letting those who the decision affected (the teams) know first. The fallout from CAMS decision led to both the Nissan and Roadways teams boycotting the final race of the series at Lakeside, though the official reason given by Nissan team manager Howard Marsden was that the Bluebirds needed further development for the upcoming 1983 Australian Endurance Championship which included both blue ribbon events, the Sandown 400 and the James Hardie 1000 at Bathurst.

Nissan's boycott of the last round also meant that series leader George Fury virtually forfeited his closest chance of winning an Australian Touring Car Championship and becoming the only driver other than Colin Bond to win both the ATCC and the Australian Rally Championship with Fury previously having won the Rally title in both 1977 and 1980. Despite this it was generally felt that the championship went to the right driver as Moffat and his RX-7 were usually the fastest combination and the expat Canadian was regarded as the man to beat. Moffat only failed to finish once at Sandown (broken axle) and finished every other race on the podium, including four wins, four pole positions and five fastest laps resulting in new lap records at Sandown, Symmons Plains, Wanneroo, Surfers (shared with Brock) and Oran Park, while Fury's best were two seconds (Calder and Wanneroo) and one third at Symmons Plains. Also in each race that both Moffat and Fury finished, the Mazda finished ahead of the Nissan, making it fairly unlikely Fury would win the championship in the last round, unless Moffat suffered a breakdown or was involved in an accident, which if either occurred would've meant the Nissan driver would win the championship in any case, hence a rather pragmatic decision was made by the Nissan team not to compete at the last event.

One outcome from this series was that in the future turbocharged cars had their engine capacities multiplied for the purposes of class point score weightings, meaning that in the 1984 Australian Touring Car Championship, the Bluebirds would compete on an equal footing with the other outright class competitors (this actually took effect prior to the start of the 1983 Endurance Championship which started two months after the ATCC concluded). Despite this meaning that the Nissan would score equal points as the RX-7's, Commodores and Falcons, Nissan team boss Howard Marsden raised no objections to the change as the 1.8 litre turbo had proven that it was able to match the speed of the outright class cars. Indeed, later in the year Fury would showcase the speed of the car, qualifying the Bluebird on the front row of the grid at Bathurst, traditionally the sole domain of the more powerful V8 powered cars.

Entrants and drivers
The following entrants and drivers competed in the 1983 Australian Touring Car Championship.

Race calendar
The 1983 Australian Touring Car Championship was contested over an eight-round series across six states with one race per round.

Classes
Car competed in two classes, 
 Up to and including 3000cc
 3001-6000cc

The "Up to and including 3000cc class" consisted of Alfa Romeo Alfetta, Datsun Bluebird turbo, Ford Capri, Ford Escort, Isuzu Gemini, Mazda 626, Mazda RX-3, Toyota Celica and Triumph Dolomite Sprint.
The "3001-6000cc class" consisted of Chevrolet Camaro, Ford Falcon, Holden Commodore and Mazda RX-7.

Points system
Championship points were awarded on a two tier system to the top twenty outright finishers in each round.

Only the best seven round results could be counted by each driver.

Results

References

External links
 Official V8 Supercar site Contains historical ATCC information.

Australian Touring Car Championship seasons
Touring Cars